The Kala Tour  is a 2007 global M.I.A. concert tour performed in support of her studio album Kala (see 2007 in music).

Tour details
The tour features dates across Europe, North America, Canada and Asia. M.I.A. began performing in support of Kala at Radio 1's Big Weekend on 20 May 2007. She made sporadic appearances at venues in the US during late 2006, including performances at Gotham Hall in New York City on 31 August 2006 where other performing acts included Cee-lo and The Rapture, and at McCarren Pool on 3 September 2006 where other performers included Spank Rock and Amanda Blank. This tour followed recording for Kala, and the Arular Tour, which ended in February 2006 with performances in Japan. The 2007 Kala tour was announced by M.I.A. on her official website and Myspace page. The setlist featured songs heard for the first time from her studio album Kala (2007), and also included songs from previous album Arular (2005). Dates included concerts at music festivals, universities, colleges and club venues around the world.

Sets

Concerts during the tour often began with political activist Koichi Toyama on a panoramic screen delivering an anarchic speech, ordering the overthrow of a government. The setlist often began with Kala's opening track "Bamboo Banga." M.I.A. selected programming, beats and videos during her set using a Lemur Input Device on stage, and performed dates with back up singer Cherry, DJs Sinden and Low B, supporting vocalists and backup dancers "The Coconut Twins" (Kesh and Zezi Ifore). On the back screen, disembodied images and film footage of break-dancing street kids, strippers, tigers, war, video games, political rhetoric, graphs, globes, laughing women and large concert crowds from her previous shows are played throughout the show. Fans were often invited on stage during the performance of "Bird Flu."

M.I.A. has collaborated with CassettePlaya, Ashish and Brian Lichtenberg and as with the Arular Tour she wore some of her own designs on tour. T-shirts such as the "How Many How Many" Tees from the "Boyz" set were sold as tour merchandise at gigs and via her website. "Kala Tour Tees" from her "Kala Tour/Okley Run" line were released in 2008.

Shows
M.I.A.'s date at the House of Blues in Chicago, US was performed with Lupe Fiasco and Emily King, whilst her dates at the Arena of Nîmes in France and at the Fox Theater in the US were performed opening for Björk. Her date at the Verizon Wireless Theatre was performed with Paul Wall. Although reports suggested that M.I.A was booked and subsequently cancelled an appearance at the Glastonbury Festival in 2007, a statement released by M.I.A.'s agents explained "Contrary to printed reports in the Guardian Guide, M.I.A. advised Glastonbury that she was unavailable to perform in late May. We are sorry if fans were led to believe otherwise. M.I.A. looks forward to performing next year.“

More dates were added to her US tour after September 2007 due to high demand. M.I.A. ended 2007 with a mini-tour of venues across the U.K. She and her label XL Recordings made available a tour diary of her late 2007 UK dates in different parts to view on YouTube. Opening acts throughout her tour included The Gray Kid, Rye Rye, Santigold, Holy Fuck, The Cool Kids, Soko, Radioclit, Buraka Som Sistema and Afrikan Boy. Her DJs also often played opening sets before her shows. On her YouTube account, M.I.A. posted a video of her and her tourmates during an encore performance of "Paper Planes" at the Electric Factory in Philadelphia, where she named the tour the "KALA Back 2 P.O.W.A. Tour."

The KALA tour ended in December 2007, with will.i.am, Paul Wall, the Beastie Boys, Nick Zinner and Brian Chase of the Yeah Yeah Yeahs and Pavement's Mark Ibold among attendees. It was followed by M.I.A.'s People vs. Money Tour in 2008.

Set list
M.I.A. did not follow the same setlist at every show, but played combinations of the following songs. "Galang" and "Paper Planes" were variably chosen as the final song she played for the encore depending on the venue. During the Terminal 5 club performance, part of the CMJ Music Marathon, she performed mash ups of New Order's "Blue Monday" with "Jimmy", "10 Dollar" with the Eurythmics' "Sweet Dreams (Are Made of This)", (from the mixtape Piracy Funds Terrorism) and "Galang" with Lil Mama's "Lip Gloss". It was noted that the latter "served as a reminder of how much the mainstream pop/dance/rap landscape has shifted since M.I.A. first appeared in 2004, and how much certain megahits such as Fergie's "London Bridge" have come to resemble her sound."

"Video Introduction"
"Bamboo Banga"
"World Town"
"XR2"
"Pull Up the People"
"Fire Fire"
"Sunshowers"
"20 Dollar"
"Hussel"
"Jimmy"
"10 Dollar"
"U.R.A.Q.T."
"Bucky Done Gun"
"Birdflu"
"Boyz"
Encore:
"Paper Planes"
"Galang"

Tour dates

Notes

References

External links
 Official site

2007 concert tours
M.I.A. (rapper) concert tours